A Silver Lining is the second LP by the San Diego rock band We Shot the Moon. It was released to iTunes on October 6, 2009, and was made available in music stores on October 27. It was released through the Minnesota-based indie label Afternoon Records. The first single from the album, "The Bright Side," first appeared for sale in late June 2009, on the website store for Afternoon Records.

Track listing
 Miracle – 3:27
 Woke Her Up – 3:07
 Should Have Been – 2:45
 The Bright Side – 2:20
 Come Back – 3:24
 Red Night – 2:49
 In Good Time – 3:08
 A Silver Lining – 3:20
 Amarillo – 3:55
 Amy – 3:38
 Candles – 3:02

"A Silver Lining Sampler"

The band offered to give away samplers of the CD starting in late July and going until September 1. Now the band is offering the Sampler as a free download Here.

EP track listing
"The Bright Side" – 2:22
"Woke Her Up" – 3:09
"Come Back" – 3:26

Bonus Tracks:
"Hope" – 4:15 *
"Sway Your Head" – 3:19 *
"A Simple Prayer" – 1:40 **

An asterisk (*) represents that the selected song also appears on We Shot the Moon's debut LP, Fear And Love.

A double asterisk (**) represents the selected song also appears on Jonathan Jones's solo CD, We Were Young.

References

2009 albums
We Shot the Moon albums